Brooklandwood, or Brookland Wood, is a historic home located in Brooklandville, Baltimore County, Maryland. Its grounds became developed for the St. Paul's School for Boys.

The house is a -story, five-bay dwelling.  The central block and two later wings are brick, painted white. The central-block section is original and built about 1790, with porches and Palladian-style windows forming a symmetrical, functional unit.  It was owned by Captain John Cockey and then sold to Charles Carroll of Carrollton, and several of his descendants: Carroll's daughter and son-in-law Mary and Richard Caton, parents of Emily Caton, who married John MacTavish, the British Consul to Baltimore in the early 1800s. It was also owned by Isaac E. Emerson, the inventor of Bromo-Seltzer.

It was listed on the National Register of Historic Places on February 11, 1972.

References

External links
, including photo from 2006, at Maryland Historical Trust

Brooklandville, Maryland
Houses on the National Register of Historic Places in Maryland
Houses in Baltimore County, Maryland
Houses completed in 1790
Carroll family residences
Palladian Revival architecture in Maryland
Federal architecture in Maryland
National Register of Historic Places in Baltimore County, Maryland